The Egyptian Premier League, also known as WE Egyptian Premier League (WE EPL) after the addition of title sponsor WE, is a professional association football league in Egypt and the top level of the Egyptian football league system. The league comprises 18 teams and operates on a system of promotion and relegation with the Egyptian Second Division. Seasons mostly run from August to May. Unlike most other leagues, all games are played all over the week.

The Egyptian Premier League was founded in 1948, unifying the local leagues that had existed previously. 70 clubs have competed in the league since its founding. Al Ahly have won the title 42 times, more than any other club. Their closest rivals, Zamalek, have won the league 14 times. Only five other clubs have won the league; those clubs are Ghazl El Mahalla, Ismaily, Al Mokawloon Al Arab, Olympic Club, and Tersana.

The Egyptian Premier League is one of the top national leagues, ranked second in Africa according to CAF's 5-Year Ranking for the 2022–23 season, based on performances in African competitions over the past five seasons. Egyptian teams have won the CAF Champions League a record 16 times, and Al Ahly was named the African Club of the Century by CAF. Two clubs have also won the CAF Confederation Cup.

The Egyptian Premier League once had among highest average stadium attendance in Africa and the Middle East until the Port Said Stadium riot occurred on 1 February 2012 after a league match involving Al Masry and Al Ahly, where 74 people were killed and more than 500 were injured. Since that date, all domestic football matches were played behind closed doors until 2017, when the local security authorities started to allow fans to attend selected matches with gradually increasing numbers starting from 100 attendance only and in 2021, the league started to welcome back thousands of supporters.

History
Association football was introduced to Egypt while it was occupied by the British. The first football club in Egypt was El Sekka El Hadid, which was founded in 1903. The Sultan Hussein Cup was founded in 1917, and though it was dominated by English clubs in its first years, Egyptian clubs quickly gained power. The Egypt Cup, which no British teams competed in, began in 1922.
 
The first major football league in Egypt also began play in 1922; consisting of clubs from Cairo, it was called the Cairo Zone Competition. Three other leagues, in Alexandria, on the Suez Canal, and an obscure league in 'Bahary' began soon afterwards. It was at this time that the clubs Al-Ahly and Zamalek began their dominance, with the two clubs regularly winning the Cairo Zone Competition and the Egypt Cup.

In 1938, the Egyptian Football Association (EFA) took control of the Cairo Zone Competition, along with the other three leagues. The Cairo Zone Competition was renamed the Cairo League, but otherwise remained mostly unchanged until the mid-1940s. The EFA felt that a national league, rather than many local leagues, was necessary. The President of the EFA passed the idea on to King Farouk I, who was an avid football fan. The Egyptian Premier League was founded by royal decree, and began play in 1948.

Early Years (1948–60)

The first match, played on October 22, was between King Farouk Club (now Zamalek) and Al Masry SC, and finished in a 5–1 victory for Farouk. The match featured the first goal in the Egyptian Premier League, scored by Farouk's Mohamed Amin, and the first hat-trick in the new league, by Suad Rustom. During this time, Priemer League results in matches between clubs from Cairo were counted as Cairo League results as well. The Cairo League ceased play in 1952.

Al Ahly won the first three competitions, though in 1949–50 they required a playoff against Tersana SC. The league was not contested during what would have been the 1951–52 season, as Egypt's national team were competing in the 1952 Summer Olympics. The season also did not take place due to the 1952 Egyptian revolution, in which King Farouk was overthrown. Farouk had allowed his name to be used by his favourite club, which quickly renamed itself Zamalek after the revolution. Gamal Abdel Nasser, who led the coup and took power after Farouk, was a supporter of Al-Ahly, and was named club president soon after he came to power. This increased the intensity of the already fierce Cairo derby between Al-Ahly and Zamalek.

Turbulent Times (1960–1974)
Al Ahly won the competition every season until the 1959–60 competition. The 1954–55 season was even stopped when Al Ahly conflicted with the federation and refused to play. No title was awarded. In the 1959–60 competition season, Zamalek finally won their first title after consistently being runners-up. Al Ahly's grip on the league loosened; though they did win some titles, in the 1965–66 edition, they finished in 6th out of 12, closer to relegation than to the championship. The decade had five different champions: Ismaily won their first title during this decade, and El-Olympi and Tersana won the league for the only time. Also, the 1962–63 and 1963–64 seasons featured 24 teams, a higher number than ever before.

The league ceased play in 1967 due to the Six-Day War between Egypt and Israel. The war ended in a decisive victory for Israel, and league play was not resumed until 1971. In 1969, Ismaily were allowed to play in the CAF Champions League (then the African Cup of Champion Clubs) as the most recent champions. They became the first Egyptian club to win that competition, though both Al Ahly and Zamalek have now won it many more times.

In 1971, the league was restarted, only to be swiftly suspended again due to fighting at a match between Al Ahly and Zamalek. A controversial penalty for Zamalek resulted in a pitch invasion, and the dispute was so intense that the league was not allowed to continue. Ghazl El Mahalla won the league in the 1972–73 season for the only time in their history, but the league was then suspended again for the 1973–74 season because of the Yom Kippur War.

Post-war Period (1974–2002)
The league returned to its 24-team format for the 1975–76 championship, but it quickly reverted to a format featuring between 12 and 16 teams. After the Yom Kippur War, Al Ahly won three championships straight, followed by a single championship for Zamalek. This pattern would continue until 1990: Al Ahly would win many championships, followed by a single win for Zamalek. This was only interrupted by Al Mokawloon winning the 1982–83 edition. This is the latest time a team has won the League for the first time. Al Ahly and Zamalek also dominated the CAF Champions League, starting with a 1982 triumph for Al Ahly. The Egyptian Priemer League became the most successful league in that tournament when Zamalek won in 1993.

The league was not played in 1990 because of Egypt's qualification for the 1990 World Cup. After this delay, Ismaily won the 1990–91 season, followed by Zamalek winning twice in a row, and after that Al Ahly won every season until the turn of the century. Zamalek and Ismaily briefly rose in power once again between 2000 and 2004, and Ismaily's 2001–02 win is the latest time that a team other than Zamalek and Al Ahly have won.

Normalcy, then Disaster (2002–2013)
Between 2004 and 2011, Al Ahly won every edition of the Egyptian Premier League, occasianally being challenged by Zamalek or Ismaily. They also continued to dominate the CAF Champions League, becoming the most successful team in the competition. The league was one of the strongest and best-attended in Africa, ranking near the top of the CAF 5-Year Ranking since its inception. In 2011, another revolution began, part of the Arab Spring, which eventually resulting in the overthrow of Hosni Mubarak. Football featured heavily in the popular uprising, as ultras from clubs such as Al Ahly took part in the revolution.

Port Said Stadium Disaster

On 1 February 2012, a riot began at Port Said Stadium at a match between Al Masry and Al Ahly. Fans of Al Masry had brought weapons and stormed the field after their team won the match. These fans then charged Al Ahly fans, who could not flee because the gates behind them were locked. 74 people, mostly fans of Al Ahly, died of stab wounds, concussions, and suffocation. Over 500 people were injured. In the days after the riot, the police response was questioned—they appeared to do little to protect Al Ahly fans. It was widely speculated that the police themselves had incited the riot, perhaps as revenge for the role of Al Ahly ultras in the overthrow of Hosni Mubarak the previous year.

The violence and resulting trial tore Egypt apart for weeks. The season was cancelled, with Haras El Hodoud at the top of the table and possibly heading for a surprise victory. Fans were to be barred from entering matches for years afterwards, but the Egyptian Premier League attempted to get back on its feet the next season.

Behind Closed Doors (2013–2021)
The 2012–13 season was cancelled as a result of the 2013 Egyptian coup d'état. After this, the Egyptian Premier League gradually returned to power. Al Ahly has won most seasons since 2013, and have also won two CAF Champions Leagues. Zamalek has won two league titles as well. An attempted return of fans was cancelled when a riot at a match between Zamalek and ENPPI resulted in 19 deaths. Fans were finally going to be let back into stadiums when the COVID-19 pandemic began, delaying the return until 2021.

In general, AL Ahly and Zamalek are seen as dominant forces in the league, with budgets that dwarf those of all the other clubs, and Ismaily seen as a distant third place club, occasionally challenging the big teams. In 2018, Al Assiouty Sport were bought by Saudi billionaire Turki Al-Sheikh and renamed Pyramids FC. They have since become a strong competitor in the Premier League and also the CAF Confederation Cup, replacing Ismaily as the third-strongest team in the league.

Partial fans return (2021–Present)
At the beginning of the 2021–22 season, 2000 fans were allowed in every match (1000 per team). The situation was getting better that in May 2022 the number increased to 5000 (2500 per team). The season witnessed an improvement of the Egyptian Premier League, the appearance of teams such as: Cairo's based Future FC and Alexandria's based Pharco FC made the league more challenging and entertaining. Zamalek defended their title after they won the 2021–22 edition of the league, while Al Ahly witnessed a mass deterioration and even finished the league in the 3rd place (behind Pyramids FC and Zamalek) to be out of the top two since 1992 when the club ended the league in the 4th place. Ismaily was on the verge of relegation to the second division but the club eventually managed to improve its results and finished the season in 9th place, while the newly founded Future FC finished in 5th place and managed to qualify for the CAF Confederation Cup, as it was in fourth place in most of the 2021–22 season but lost the position to Tala’ea El Geish right at the end of the season. At the start of the 2022–23 season, 3000 fans per team were allowed to attend matches.

Competition format and sponsorship

Competition

There are 18 clubs in the Egyptian Premier League. The season lasts from August to May. During the course of the season, each club plays the others twice, once at their home stadium and once at that of their opponents, for a total of 34 games. Teams receive three points for a win and one point for a draw. No points are awarded for a loss. Teams are ranked by total points, then the head-to-head record between the teams in question, then goal difference, and then goals scored.
At the end of each season, the club with the most points is crowned champion. If points are equal, the head-to-head record between the teams in question, then goal difference, and then goals scored determine the winner. At the end of the season, the three lowest placed teams are relegated into the Egyptian Second League. The Egyptian Second League consists of three groups; the winner of each group is promoted. This system has been around since 2015; before then, the number of teams and relegation places was variable.

Sponsorship
The Egyptian Premier League has been sponsored since 2005. The sponsor has been able to determine the league's sponsorship name. The list below details who the sponsors have been and what they called the competition:

2005–07: Vodafone Egyptian Premier League
2007–11: Etisalat Egyptian Premier League
2011–14: Vodafone Egyptian Premier League
2014–present: Egyptian Premier League (Sponsored by Presentation Sports)

Qualification for African competitions

Association ranking for 2022–23 CAF competitions
Legend
 CL: CAF Champions League
 CC: CAF Confederation Cup

Media coverage
As the two most powerful clubs, Al Ahly and Zamalek were, before 2014, allowed to negotiate their own television deals. This allowed them to gain the largest television revenue of any club. In 2014, the league negotiated a £E 70,000,000 ($10,160,000) deal with the state-owned Nile Sport Network. However, the deal still guaranteed a great deal of money for Al Ahly and Zamalek, with 10% of revenue going to the team that had won the most Egyptian Premier Leagues (which is, comfortably, Al Ahly), and 10% going to the teams who appeared on television most frequently. Still, the deal did break the tradition of allowing the two clubs to negotiate deals that produced far more profit than the rest of the clubs in the league.

In 2016, ON Sport TV was granted the rights to televise Egyptian Premier League games. The network is part of the state-owned Egyptian Media Group, which also controls EPL sponsor Presentation Sports. On Sport launched TIME SPORTS to televise the 2019 Africa Cup of Nations which was hosted by Egypt, right and after the end of the tournament, ON sport TV merged with TIME SPORTS and became known as ON TIME Sports.

Clubs
A total of 70 clubs have played in the Egyptian Premier League from its inception in 1948–49 up to and including the 2020–21 season. But only two clubs have been members of the Egyptian Premier League for every season since its inception. These are Al Ahly and Zamalek, meanwhile Al-Ittihad and Al Masry have been absent only for two seasons of the League since its inception.

Egyptian Premier League current clubs
The following 18 clubs are competing in the Egyptian Premier League as of the 2021–22 season.

Al Ahly
Al-Ittihad
Al Masry
Al Mokawloon
Ceramica Cleopatra
El Gouna
El-Sharkeyah+
ENPPI
Future FC+

Ghazl El Mahalla
Ismaily
Misr El Makkasa
National Bank
Pharco FC+
Pyramids FC
Smouha
El Geish
Zamalek

+Promoted teams (from the 2020–21 Second Division season to the Premier League)

locations

Current stadiums

List of seasons
The following table provides a summary of seasons:

{| class="wikitable sortable"
|-
! style="width:9%;"|No.
! style="width:9%;"|Season
! style="width:19%;"|Champions(number of titles)
! style="width:18%;"|Runners-up
! style="width:18%;"|Third place
|-
!1
|1948–49
|Al Ahly (1)
|Tersana
|Ismaily
|-
!2
|1949–50
|Al Ahly (2)
|Tersana
|Zamalek
|-
!3
|1950–51
|Al Ahly (3)
|Zamalek
|Al Masry
|-
!—
|1951–52 ||colspan=3 style=background:#efefef|
|-
!4
|1952–53
|Al Ahly (4)
|Zamalek
|Al Masry
|-
!5
|1953–54
|Al Ahly (5)
|Zamalek
|Tersana
|-
!—
|1954–55 ||colspan=3 style=background:#efefef|{{center|Not finished due to refusal of Al Ahly to comply with the federation's penalty of playing one match away from home.}}
|-
!6
|1955–56
|Al Ahly (6)
|Zamalek
|El Qannah
|-
!7
|1956–57
|Al Ahly (7)
|Zamalek
|Ismaily
|-
!8
|1957–58
|Al Ahly (8)
|Zamalek
|El Olympi
|-
!9
|1958–59
|Al Ahly (9)
|Zamalek
|Tersana
|-
!10
|1959–60
|Zamalek (1)
|Tersana
|Al Ahly
|-
!11
|1960–61
|Al Ahly (10)
|Zamalek
|Tersana
|-
!12
|1961–62
|Al Ahly (11)
|Zamalek
|Tersana
|-
!13
|1962–63
|Tersana (1)
|Zamalek
|Al Ahly
|-
!14
|1963–64
|Zamalek (2)
|Tersana
|Ismaily
|-
!15
|1964–65
|Zamalek (3)
|Ismaily
|Tersana
|-
!16
|1965–66
|El Olympi (1)
|Zamalek
|Ismaily
|-
!17
|1966–67
|Ismaily (1)
|Al Ahly
|Tersana
|-
!—
|1967–71 ||colspan=3 style=background:#efefef|
|-
!—
|1971–72 ||colspan=3 style=background:#efefef|
|-
!18
|1972–73
|Ghazl El Mahalla (1)
|Zamalek
|Ismaily
|-
!—
|1973–74 ||colspan=3 style=background:#efefef|
|-
!19
|1974–75
|Al Ahly (12)
|Tersana
|Ismaily
|-
!20
|1975–76
|Al Ahly (13)
|Ghazl El Mahalla
|Zamalek
|-
!21
|1976–77
|Al Ahly (14)
|Zamalek
|El Ittihad El Sakndary
|-
!22
|1977–78
|Zamalek (4)
|Al Ahly
|El Olympi
|-
!23
|1978–79
|Al Ahly (15)
|Zamalek
|Ghazl El Mahalla
|-
!24
|1979–80
|Al Ahly (16)
|Zamalek
|Al Masry
|-
!25
|1980–81
|Al Ahly (17)
|Zamalek
|Al Masry
|-
!26
|1981–82
|Al Ahly (18)
|Zamalek
|El Ittihad El Sakndary
|-
!27
|1982–83
|Al Mokawloon (1)
|Zamalek
|Al Ahly
|-
!28
|1983–84
|Zamalek (5)
|Al Ahly
|Ismaily
|-
!29
|1984–85
|Al Ahly (19)
|Zamalek
|Ismaily
|-
!30
|1985–86
|Al Ahly (20)
|Zamalek
|Ismaily
|-
!31
|1986–87
|Al Ahly (21)
|Zamalek
|Tersana
|-
!32
|1987–88
|Zamalek (6)
|Al Ahly
|Ghazl El Mahalla
|-
!33
|1988–89
|Al Ahly (22)
|Zamalek
|Ghazl El Mahalla
|-
!—
|1989–90 ||colspan=3 style=background:#efefef|
|-
!34
|1990–91
|Ismaily (2)
|Al Ahly
|Zamalek
|-
!35
|1991–92
|Zamalek (7)
|Ismaily
|Ghazl El Mahalla
|-
!36
|1992–93
|Zamalek (8)
|Al Ahly
|Ghazl El Mahalla
|-
!37
|1993–94
|Al Ahly (23)
|Ismaily
|Zamalek
|-
!38
|1994–95
|Al Ahly (24)
|Zamalek
|Ismaily
|-
!39
|1995–96
|Al Ahly (25)
|Zamalek
|Ismaily
|-
!40
|1996–97
|Al Ahly (26)
|Zamalek
|El Mansoura
|-
!41
|1997–98
|Al Ahly (27)
|Zamalek
|Al Mokawloon
|-
!42
|1998–99
|Al Ahly (28)
|Zamalek
|Ismaily
|-
!43
|1999–00
|Al Ahly (29)
|Ismaily
|Zamalek
|-
!44
|2000–01
|Zamalek (9)
|Al Ahly
|Al Masry
|-
!45
|2001–02
|Ismaily (3)
|Al Ahly
|Zamalek
|-
!46
|2002–03
|Zamalek (10)
|Al Ahly
|Ismaily
|-
!47
|2003–04
|Zamalek (11)
|Al Ahly
|Ismaily
|-
!48
|2004–05
|Al Ahly (30)
|ENPPI
|Haras El Hodoud 
|-
!49
|2005–06
|Al Ahly (31)
|Zamalek
|ENPPI
|-
!50
|2006–07
|Al Ahly (32)
|Zamalek
|Ismaily
|-
!51
|2007–08
|Al Ahly (33)
|Ismaily
|Zamalek
|-
!52
|2008–09
|Al Ahly  (34)
|Ismaily
|Petrojet
|-
!53
|2009–10
|Al Ahly (35)
|Zamalek
|Ismaily
|-
!54
|2010–11
|Al Ahly (36)
|Zamalek
|Ismaily
|-
!—
|2011–12|colspan=3 style=background:#efefef|
|-
!—
|2012–13|colspan=3 style=background:#efefef|
|-
!55
|2013–14
|Al Ahly (37)
|Smouha
|Zamalek
|-
!56
|2014–15
|Zamalek (12)
|Al Ahly
|ENPPI
|-
!57
|2015–16
|Al Ahly (38)
|Zamalek
|Smouha
|-
!58
|2016–17
|Al Ahly (39)
|Misr Lel Makasa
|Zamalek
|-
!59
|2017–18
|Al Ahly (40)
|Ismaily
|Al Masry
|-
!60
|2018–19
|Al Ahly (41)
|Zamalek
|Pyramids
|-
!61
|2019–20
|Al Ahly (42)
|Zamalek
|Pyramids
|-
!62
|2020–21
|Zamalek (13)
|Al Ahly
|Pyramids
|-
!63
|2021–22
|Zamalek (14)
|Pyramids
|Al Ahly
|}

Performance

Performance by club

Performance by city

Doubles
Two teams have won the double of the Egyptian Premier League and the Egypt Cup.

Statistics

All seasons top goalscorers

All time top goalscorersLast updated 15 February 2023.''

All time top appearances

See also
 Football in Egypt

References

Notes

External links
 Official website
Premier League at soccerway.com; standings, results & fixtures
egyptianfootball.net
RSSSF competition history
goal.com Egyptian Premier League
Egyptian Premier League

 

 
Top level football leagues in Africa
Sports leagues established in 1948
1
Football